John Forman (April 27, 1925 – February 24, 1998) was an American sports shooter. He competed in the 25 metre pistol event at the 1956 Summer Olympics.

References

1925 births
1998 deaths
American male sport shooters
Olympic shooters of the United States
Shooters at the 1956 Summer Olympics
Sportspeople from Jackson, Mississippi
Pan American Games medalists in shooting
Pan American Games gold medalists for the United States
Pan American Games bronze medalists for the United States
Shooters at the 1955 Pan American Games
20th-century American people